Gongbu may refer to:

 Gongbu (mountaineer), a Tibetan member of the 1960 Chinese Mount Everest Expedition
 romanized Korean pronunciation of Gongfu
 Gong Bu, a stance in Wushu and other Chinese martial arts
 Ministry of Works (imperial China), one of the Six Ministries from the Tang to the Qing